This is a list of international organization leaders in any given year.

Twenty-first century
2017 - 2016 - 2015 - 2014 - 2013 - 2012 - 2011 - 2010 - 2009 - 2008 - 2007 - 2006 - 2005 - 2004 - 2003 - 2002 - 2001

Twentieth century
2000 - 1999 - 1998 - 1997 - 1996 - 1995 - 1994 - 1993 - 1992 - 1991
1990 - 1989 - 1988 - 1987 - 1986 - 1985 - 1984 - 1983 - 1982 - 1981
1980 - 1979 - 1978 - 1977 - 1976 - 1975 - 1974 - 1973 - 1972 - 1971
1970 - 1969 - 1968 - 1967 - 1966 - 1965 - 1964 - 1963 - 1962 - 1961
1960 - 1959 - 1958 - 1957 - 1956 - 1955 - 1954 - 1953 - 1952 - 1951
1950 - 1949 - 1948 - 1947 - 1946 - 1945 - 1944 - 1943 - 1942 - 1941
1940 - 1939 - 1938 - 1937 - 1936 - 1935 - 1934 - 1933 - 1932 - 1931
1930 - 1929 - 1928 - 1927 - 1926 - 1925 - 1924 - 1923 - 1922 - 1921
1920 - 1919 - 1918 - 1917 - 1916 - 1915 - 1914 - 1913 - 1912 - 1911
1910 - 1909 - 1908 - 1907 - 1906 - 1905 - 1904 - 1903 - 1902 - 1901

 International organization leaders by year